Tamil Nadu College of Engineering also known as TCE is situated at Karumathampatti, Coimbatore, Tamil Nadu, India. The college was established in 1984. The college is affiliated to Anna University. This college is managed by the Tamil Nadu Technical Education Foundation.

The institution was founded by philanthropists Lion T.N. Palanisamy and P.V. Ravi.

Location 
The college is situated near NH 544 in Karumathampatti, which is 30 km from the industrial city of Coimbatore, on the way to Avinashi. TCE is situated at Chenniyandavar Kovil which is 4 km from Karumathampatti in NH544 road side. Karumathampatti is a suburb of Coimbatore, under the Coimbatore corporation.

Courses 
Undergraduate courses
 BE Automobile Engineering(60 seats)
 BE Civil Engineering(30 seats)
 BE Computer Science and Engineering(120 seats)
 BE Electrical and Electronics Engineering(60 seats)
 BE Electronics & Communication Engineering(120 seats)
 BTech Information Technology(120 seats)
 BE Instrumentation and Control Engineering (30 seats)
 BE Mechanical Engineering(120 seats)

Postgraduate courses
 ME Structural Engineering(18 seats)
 ME Computer and Communication(18 seats)
 MBA (Master of Business Administration)(60 seats)
 MCA (Master of Computer Application)(30 seats)

Ph.D

 Computer Science

Facilities 
Library The academy library is the main source of books, periodicals and other study materials for students during their courses.

Computing facilities The college has two computer laboratories equipped with around 80 computers.

On-campus student residence Halls of Residence for men and women students are available separately. The men’s residence can accommodate 300 students and the women’s residence can accommodate 100 students. There is a separate block for First year students.

Technopark

Auditorium The fully air-conditioned auditorium with a capacity of 1200 seating and an excellent stage is available and used to conduct all cultural festivals and functions.

Seminar halls There are four conference halls with ample seating capacity to conduct seminars, symposiums, conferences, meetings, etc. With full-fledged computing facilities.

Other amenities

 Canteen with a seating capacity of 100 members at a time.
The water treatment plant in the hostel (RO system)
ATM facility of Syndicate Bank
College buses are available for the transport of day-scholar students and staff.
Reverse osmosis plants

Field of study 
Department of Civil Engineering
The department was established in 2006. The department offers electives in subjects such as GIS, FEM, Repair and Rehabilitation of Structure and Pre-fabricated Structures. It has facilities for tests on building materials, and soil and water samples. The department offers consultancy services like topographical surveys including contouring, analysis and design of concrete and steel structures, water sample analysis and building materials testing for many private, state and central government organizations.

Department of Mechanical Engineering

The department was established in 2006.
The Department provides value-added design courses to enhance the employability of the students. The Department also conduct so many seminars and workshops each semester throughout the years. This department is very much known for its unity.

Department of Electronics and Communication Engineering
The department started in 2006. ME Computer and Communication started in 2005. M Karthikeyan is the Head of the department.

Department of Computer Science and Engineering
The department started in 2006. It offers a bachelor's degree in Computer Science and Engineering.

Department of Information Technology
The department started in 2006.

Department of Electrical and Electronics Engineering
The department started in 2006.

Student bodies 
Department Associations
 Association of Civil Engineering
 Association of Mechanical Engineering
 Association of Electronics & Communication Engineering
 Association of Electrical & Electronics Engineering
 Association of Computer Science and Engineering
 Association of Information Technology

Every academic year, the departments organize national level technical symposiums.

Extra-curricular activities
 Voluntary Blood donation Club
 Tamil Mandram
 Literary Association

Sports 
The Department of Physical Education is in charge of the sports activities of the college. The college has outdoor and indoor games facilities. The sporting facilities are available in a total playground area around  comprising
 Concrete basketball court
 Volleyball court
 Foot Ball Field
 Ball badminton court
 Cricket ground

Notable alumni 
 Tovino Thomas, Malayalam Film Actor
 Akash S Madhavan, World dwarf games silver medalist

Placement and training 
The Placement and Training Cell:
 advises students on career options with cost, 
 provides information on training and employment opportunities with cost, 
 provides guidance and counselling services, 
 arranges for placement with cost,
 arranges courses on personality development with cost,
 conducts seminars, lectures, career guidance programmes and entrepreneurship development programmes.

Events
Tamil Nadu College of Engineering has hosted events like Microsoft Dreamsprak Yatra, TEDxCoimbatore for TEDxChange, and IEEE Conference.

Engineering colleges in Coimbatore
Educational institutions established in 1984
1984 establishments in Tamil Nadu